The Breakthrough Prizes are a set of international awards bestowed in three categories by the Breakthrough Prize Board in recognition of scientific advances. The awards are part of several "Breakthrough" initiatives founded and funded by Yuri Milner and his wife Julia Milner, along with Breakthrough Initiatives and Breakthrough Junior Challenge.

Breakthrough Prize in Mathematics
Breakthrough Prize in Fundamental Physics
Breakthrough Prize in Life Sciences

The Breakthrough Prizes were founded by Sergey Brin, Priscilla Chan and Mark Zuckerberg, Yuri and Julia Milner, and Anne Wojcicki. The Prizes have been sponsored by the personal foundations established by Sergey Brin, Priscilla Chan and Mark Zuckerberg, Ma Huateng, Jack Ma, Yuri and Julia Milner, and Anne Wojcicki. Committees of previous laureates choose the winners from candidates nominated in a process that is online and open to the public.

Laureates receive $3 million each in prize money. They attend a televised award ceremony designed to celebrate their achievements and inspire the next generation of scientists. As part of the ceremony schedule, they also engage in a program of lectures and discussions. Those that go on to make fresh discoveries remain eligible for future Breakthrough Prizes.

Trophy
The trophy was created by artist Olafur Eliasson. Like much of Eliasson's work, the sculpture explores the common ground between art and science. It is molded into the shape of a toroid, recalling natural forms found from black holes and galaxies to seashells and coils of DNA.

Ceremonies

See also
 Breakthrough Initiatives
 Breakthrough Starshot

References

External links
Breakthrough Prize on Facebook Official

Academic awards
Alphabet Inc.
International awards
Awards established in 2012
Science and technology awards
Russian science and technology awards
Yuri Milner